Sazetidine A (AMOP-H-OH) is a drug which acts as a subtype selective partial agonist at α4β2 neural nicotinic acetylcholine receptors, acting as an agonist at (α4)2(β2)3 pentamers, but as an antagonist at (α4)3(β2)2 pentamers. It has potent analgesic effects in animal studies comparable to those of epibatidine, but with less toxicity, and also has antidepressant action.

References 

Nicotinic agonists
Azetidines
Phenol ethers
Pyridines
Alkyne derivatives
Primary alcohols